Thomas P. Cothran (October 24, 1857 – April 11, 1934) was an associate justice of the South Carolina Supreme Court. He was admitted to the South Carolina bar in 1878. He was elected while serving as the Speaker of the House of the South Carolina House of Representatives to succeed Justice Hydrick on January 28, 1921. He is buried in the Upper Long Cane Cemetery in Abbeville, South Carolina.

References

Justices of the South Carolina Supreme Court
1857 births
1934 deaths
Place of death missing
Members of the South Carolina House of Representatives
Speakers of the South Carolina House of Representatives
University of Virginia alumni